This article is the discography of the Scottish pop and rock singer-songwriter Annie Lennox. After a decade of major international success as part of Eurythmics, Lennox began her solo career in earnest in 1992 with the release of her first album Diva. A multi-platinum success, she has since released five further solo studio albums, three of them being covers albums (including a Christmas-themed album) and also a greatest hits collection. Six of her albums have reached the UK top ten, and two of them reached number one.

Lennox has earned the distinction of 'most successful female British artist in UK music history' due to her global commercial success since the 1980s. Including her work with Eurythmics, Lennox is one of the world's best-selling music artists, having sold over 80 million records worldwide.

Albums

Studio albums

Compilation albums

EPs

Singles

Video albums

Music videos

Other appearances

References

External links
Official Annie Lennox website

Discography
Pop music discographies
Discographies of British artists
Rock music discographies